Trimethylsilyl cyanide is the chemical compound with the formula (CH3)3SiCN. This volatile liquid consists of a cyanide group, that is CN, attached to a trimethylsilyl group. The molecule is used in organic synthesis as the equivalent of hydrogen cyanide.  It is prepared by the reaction of lithium cyanide and trimethylsilyl chloride:
LiCN + (CH3)3SiCl → (CH3)3SiCN + LiCl

Structure
The molecule exhibits the expected structure of a nitrile-like compound. The compound exists in a facile equilibrium with a small amount of the isomeric isocyanide (CH3)3SiNC. By contrast, the nearly isostructural tert-butyl nitrile does not readily isomerize to tert-butyl isocyanide.

Reactions
Trimethylsilyl cyanide hydrolyzes to give hydrogen cyanide and trimethylsilanol:
(CH3)3SiCN + H2O → (CH3)3SiOH + HCN

In its principal application, it adds across carbon-oxygen double bonds, for example in an aldehyde, to form a new carbon-carbon bond:
 + (CH3)3SiC≡N → N≡C–Si(CH3)3
The product is an O-silylated cyanohydrin.

One use of this reagent is to convert pyridine-N-oxides into 2-cyanopyridine. This transformation is best done in dichloromethane solution using dimethylcarbamoyl chloride as the activating electrophile. It is possible to use benzoyl chloride but the yields and regioselectivity of the addition of the cyano group are lower.

Acetone cyanohydrin can be used to reversibly generate the cyanide anion.
(4)

Safety
This chemical is rated as "Fatal if swallowed, in contact with skin or if inhaled" as it hydrolyzes in the presence of moisture to give hydrogen cyanide gas.

Disposal by using dilute solution of alkali hydroxide is recommended.

References

Nitriles
Trimethylsilyl compounds